This article gives a list of episodes for the British television sitcom, Shine on Harvey Moon which aired during the 1980s and 1990s. The show ran for five seasons, beginning in 1982 and concluding in 1995. It principally starred Maggie Steed, Elizabeth Spriggs, Kenneth Cranham, Nigel Planer and Lee Whitlock.

Episodes

Series 1 (Early 1982)
All the half-hour episodes in series 1 were written by Laurence Marks and Maurice Gran, and directed by Baz Taylor.

Series 2 (Late 1982)

All the hour-long episodes in series 2 were written by Maurice Gran and Laurence Marks, and directed by Baz Taylor. There were new opening and closing title sequences.

Series 3 (1984)
All episodes in series 3 were written by Laurence Marks and Maurice Gran, and directed by Baz Taylor.

Series 4 (1985)
All episodes in series 4 were directed by Baz Taylor, individual writers are noted below.

Series 5 (1995)
The twelve episodes broadcast between 23 April and 18 August 1995 did not have individual titles.

Lists of British comedy-drama television series episodes
Lists of British period drama television series episodes